Süleler may refer to the following villages in Turkey:

 Süleler, Dursunbey
 Süleler, Kızılcahamam